Putt-Putt Enters the Race is an educational adventure game developed and published by Humongous Entertainment on January 1, 1999. The game is the fifth entry in the Putt-Putt series. This is the first of three games to feature Nancy Cartwright as the voice of Putt-Putt.

Production
The game was created by Humongous Games as part of the popular edutainment series Putt-Putt in January 1999. The game was re-released in 2014 for iOS, Android, and Steam.

Plot
While playing with Pep, Putt-Putt receives a letter from Redline Rick inviting him to enter the Cartown 500 race. Excited, Putt-Putt goes to the Speedway to sign up. Redline Rick says that if Putt-Putt wants to be a race car, he'll need Extra High-Powered High-Octane Gasoline, Super Speedy Radial Racing Tires, a safety helmet for Pep to wear during the race and a triangular flag with a random number on it. Putt-Putt decides to get those items around Cartown, determined to enter.

To get the tires and items he needs, Putt-Putt must give Chuck the Tow Truck a patch from his Tire Patch Kit at his Tire Center, as one of Chuck's tires is flat from running into a nail. After helping Chuck, he can get all four tires for four coins. Also, Putt-Putt helps Pete Crane find his missing hook to move pipes out of the way of the road, Mr. Baldini getting fruits and vegetables from Torvil Tractor's farm garden to earn coins, to fill his gas, he can help Mr. Crankcase sort out his junk, Mrs. Airbag find her husband's new hubcaps (that her poodle, Ralphie, dug up) using a shovel that he borrows from Betsy after giving her a milkshake to get a gas can, to get a racing flag, Putt-Putt helps Mr. Fenderbender by getting a brick to cover up the hole after giving his cat Bonzo milk or help Outback Al feed a baby animal before getting a number, getting a safety badge for putting out a fire to get a ladder he uses to save Bonzo from a tree, or nailing, many other citizens.

After finding all four items, Putt-Putt heads over to the Speedway and gets all set up for the race. If Putt-Putt gets in the Top 3, Redline Rick will honor him with a trophy and announce him to the audience. If Putt-Putt doesn't get in the Top 3, he will get a ribbon as a reward for how he raced around the track. Regardless of the outcome, Putt-Putt will thank everyone in Cartown for getting the things he needed and declares, "It's not if you win or lose, it's how you race around the track."

Promotion
The game was officially unveiled at the 1998 Electronic Entertainment Expo in Atlanta, May 28–30, at booth 5626. Humongous Entertainment executive vice president of marketing and licensing, Ralph Giuffre, said that this title was purposely designed for younger players. On January 14, the Humongous Entertainment website (humongous.com) launched a week-long online celebration for the game, which included offering players free downloadable demos, online games, contests and other items the at Putt-Putt's Pit Stop. In December 1999, Humongous partnered with the Make-A-Wish Foundation for a holiday promotion where customers could "donate the full $10 to the Make-A-Wish Foundation or donate $2 to the charity and receive $8 back" at participating national software retail outlets for Humongous's best-selling 16 software, which included this game.

Commercial performance
According to PC Data of Reston, the game was the 5th top-selling educational title across 13 software retail chains for the week ended January 16, and the 9th top-selling home-education software for the week ended May 1.

Critical reception

Sonic praised the game for being both fun and educational, while challenging kids in creative ways. Superkids said the game was best-suited to children who have curiosity and patience. Eugene Register-Guard described the game as "challenging and entertaining". The Bryan Times praised the user interface. Lakeland Ledger thought the game was "charming". Ouders Online said the game was highly fun, and added that Putt-Putt was a good role model. The Boston Herald praised the game's "smooth animation and appealing characters", while saying that its complexity would appeal to older players. The 52 year old reviewer at The Colombian, enjoyed the interactive content, commenting that the game had a high "Giggle-to-Click Ratio". Star Tribune said that, like other Humongous games, this title was "high-quality" and "entertaining", while complimenting its replay value. The game was used in a study by The Mirror. Daily Herald deemed the game "above average" and "sweet". PC Mag said a parent "can't go wrong" with buying the game for their 3-8-year-old child.

References

External links
 The New York Times review

Point-and-click adventure games
Putt-Putt Enters the Race
Humongous Entertainment games
Infogrames games
Adventure games
Android (operating system) games
IOS games
Linux games
Classic Mac OS games
MacOS games
ScummVM-supported games
Windows games
Video games developed in the United States
Single-player video games
Children's educational video games
Tommo games